Meindert Leerling (11 January 1936 – 9 May 2021) was a Dutch journalist and politician of the defunct Reformatory Political Federation (RPF), nowadays merged in the ChristianUnion (CU).

As a member of the Reformatory Political Federation (Reformatorische Politieke Federatie) he was a member of the Dutch House of Representatives as well as a parliamentary leader from 1981 to 1994. Previously he worked as a television director and RTV journalist for the Evangelical Broadcasting (Evangelische Omroep) and as a sports journalist for several newspapers. Meindert Leerling was married twice (his first wife died in 1999) and was a member of the Reformed Association in the Protestant Church in the Netherlands (a subdivision of the Protestant Church in the Netherlands (PKN)).

Decorations

References

External links

 Oud-politicus Meindert Leerling overleden, Parlement.com, 11 May 2021
 Meindert Leerling (1936-2021): onvermoeibare doorzetter, Reformatorisch Dagblad, 12 May 2021

 
 
 

 

1936 births
2021 deaths
20th-century Dutch journalists
20th-century Dutch male writers
20th-century Dutch politicians
21st-century Dutch male writers
Christian Zionists
Dutch expatriates in Israel
Dutch members of the Dutch Reformed Church
Dutch nonprofit directors
Dutch political writers
Dutch sports journalists
Dutch sportswriters
Dutch television directors
Dutch television editors
Dutch television producers
Dutch Zionists
Knights of the Order of the Netherlands Lion
Leaders of political parties in the Netherlands
Members of the House of Representatives (Netherlands)
People from Bergambacht
People from Heerjansdam
Protestant Church Christians from the Netherlands
Reformatory Political Federation politicians